Nakamura Keith Haring Collection is a private museum collection of American artist Keith Haring artworks, located in the city of Hokuto, Yamanashi Prefecture of Japan. The museum is the only in the world dedicated to the work of Keith Haring. The collection is housed in an award-winning museum building, created in 2007 by architect Atsushi Kitagawara, and exhibits the collection of Kazuo Nakamura, CEO of CMIC Group.

References

External links

Museums in Yamanashi Prefecture
Private art collections
Hokuto, Yamanashi
Keith Haring